Marie Firmin Bocourt (19 April 1819 – 4 February 1904) was a French zoologist and artist.

As a young man, he worked as a preparateur for the zoologist Gabriel Bibron (1805–1848), later serving as a museum artist. In 1861, he was sent to Thailand (then called Siam), where he explored the fauna and brought back an important collection of specimens.

He collaborated with Auguste Duméril (1812–1870) on a series called Mission scientifique au Mexique et dans l'Amérique Centrale, a result of Bocourt's scientific expedition to Mexico and Central America in 1864–1866, in one part during the French Intervention in Mexico led by Napoleon III. Auguste Duméril died in 1870, and the project was continued by Bocourt with assistance from Léon Vaillant (1834–1914), François Mocquard (1834–1917) and Fernand Angel (1881–1950). With Vaillant, he published a study on fishes, "Études sur les poissons ", that was included in Mission scientifique au Mexique et dans l'Amérique Centrale.

As an artist, he specialized in engravings, doing portraits of contemporary people as well as zoological illustrations.

Taxa named in honor of Bocourt
Bocourt has a number of zoological species and subspecies named after him, including the following.
Bocourt's swimming crab, Callinectes bocourti , native to the Caribbean
Bocourt's eyelid skink, Phoboscincus bocourti , native to New Caledonia
Bocourt's black-headed snake, Tantilla bocourti , native to Mexico
Incilius bocourti , a Central American toad
Craugastor bocourti , a frog native to Guatemala
Hyla bocourti , a frog native to Guatemala
Cincelichthys bocourti , a Central American cichlid
Agama bocourti , a lizard native to West Africa
Anolis bocourtii , a lizard native to northern South America
Atractus bocourti , a snake native to northwestern South America
Micrurus bocourti , a venomous snake native to northwestern South America
Mystus bocourti , a catfish native to Southeast Asia
Pangasius bocourti , a catfish native to Southeast Asia
Polemon bocourti , a rear-fanged snake native to Central Africa
Sceloporus occidentalis bocourtii , a lizard native to California
Subsessor bocourti , a snake native to Southeast Asia

Nota bene: A binomial authority in parentheses indicates that the species was originally described in a different genus.

Works
 Bocourt, F. (1868) Descriptions de quelques crotaliens nouveaux appartenant au genre Bothrops, recueillis dans le Guatemala. Ann. Sci. Nat., Zool., ser. 5, vol. 10, p. 201–202.
 Duméril, A., Bocourt, F. Études sur les reptiles et les batraciens. en la serie "Mission scientifique au Mexique et dans l'Amérique centrale., recherches zoologiques", 3e partie, 1ère section. Paris: Imprimerie Impériale.
 Duméril, A., Bocourt, F. & Mocquard, F. (1870-1909). Mission scientifique au Mexique et dans l'Amérique Centrale. Recherches zoologiques. Paris: Imprimerie Impériale
 Bocourt, F.  (1873a) Caractères d'une  espèce nouvelle d'iguaniens le  Sceleporus acathhinus. [Characters on a New Iguana Species, Sceleporus acathinus] Ann. Sci. Nat., Zool. (5)17(6): 1.
 Bocourt, F.  (1873b) Deux notes sur quelques  sauriens de l'Amérique tropicale.  [Two Notes on Its Tropical (Pan-)American Lizards] Ann. Sci. Nat., Zool. Paleontol. (5)19(4): 1–5.
 Bocourt, F.  (1873c) Note sur quelques espèces nouvelles d'iguaniens du genre Sceleporus. [Notes on the New Iguana Species of the Genre Sceleporus] Ann. Sci. Nat., Zool. (5)17(10): 1–2.
 Bocourt, F.  (1873–1897) Études sur les reptiles. [Studies on Reptiles]  Part 3, Sect. 1, Book. 2–15, pp. 33–860,  Mission Scientifique au Mexique et dans l'Amérique Centrale - Recherches Zoologiques. Paris, Imprimerie Imperiale. p. 1012
 Bocourt, F.  (1876a) Note sur quelques reptiles du Mexique. [Notes on Its Reptiles of Mexico] Ann. Sci. Nat., Zool.(6)3(12): 1–4.
 Bocourt, F.  (1876b) Note sur quelques reptiles  de l'Isthme de Tehuantepec (Mexique) donnés par M. Sumichrast au Muséum. J. Zool. (Paris) 5: 386–411.
 Bocourt, F. (1879) Etudes sur les reptiles. [Studies on Reptiles] Miss. Sci. Mexique, Rech. ZooL. Book. 6:361-440, p. 21–22, 22A-22D

References 

1819 births
1904 deaths
French zoologists
Scientists from Paris
Artists from Paris